Amirah Charline Vann (born 1980) is an American actress and singer. She is best known for playing attorney Tegan Price in How to Get Away with Murder.

Life and career
Amirah Charline Vann was born in 1980, in Queens, New York. Her father is African-American from Georgia, and her mother is Puerto Rican. Vann attended Midwood High School and then Far Rockaway High School, graduating in 1998. She then obtained her bachelor's degree from Fordham University in 2002, and a Masters of Fine Arts degree from New York University's Tisch School of the Arts in 2007. Vann worked for many years in Off-Broadway theater before transitioning to film and television.

Vann appeared in secondary roles in films, including And So It Goes and Tracers, before her breakthrough performance as Ernestine, the head house slave of the Macon plantation, in the WGN America period drama series Underground in 2016. The series was canceled after two seasons in 2017. She later guest starred on Law & Order: Special Victims Unit, and had a recurring role on the final season of Major Crimes as Special Agent Jazzma Fey.

During the 2017–18 season, Vann was cast as attorney Tegan Price on the ABC legal drama How to Get Away with Murder. Originally a recurring role, Vann was promoted to series regular for season five and season six.

In early 2018, Vann went to star on the ABC drama pilot The Holmes Sisters produced by Regina King and Robin Roberts.
Vann also has a recurring role on the USA Network limited series Unsolved: The Murder of Tupac and The Notorious B.I.G. as an FBI agent assigned to the multi-agency taskforce assigned to the Christopher Wallace murder investigation.

In 2019, Vann was cast as corporate lobbyist Parker Campbell in season four of the OWN drama Queen Sugar. Vann also appeared as Shondae Smith, a supporting role in the 2019 film Miss Virginia.

In 2020, Vann was cast as Zani in the CBS All Access drama Star Trek: Picard.

Filmography

Film

Television

Awards and nominations

See also

 List of Puerto Ricans

References

External links
 
 Amirah Vann on Instagram
 Amirah Vann on Twitter

Living people
American film actresses
American television actresses
Fordham University alumni
Far Rockaway High School alumni
People from Queens, New York
American people of Puerto Rican descent
African-American actresses
Tisch School of the Arts alumni
1980 births